Candarave is a town in the Tacna Region in southern Peru. It is the capital of Candarave Province.

Geography

Climate

References

Populated places in the Tacna Region